Formin-like protein 3 (FMNL3), also known as WW domain-binding protein 3 (WBP-3), is a protein that in humans is encoded by the FMNL3 gene.

Function 

The protein encoded by this gene contains a formin homology 2 domain and has high sequence identity to the mouse Wbp3 protein. Two alternative transcripts encoding different isoforms have been described. The C-terminus has been shown to accelerate actin polymerization activity of this protein through its WH2-like motif. FMNL3 has been crystallized in complex with actin providing insight into the mechanism of formin-mediated actin nucleation.

See also 
 FMNL1
 FMNL2

References

Further reading